Llorenç Gómez León (born 3 November 1991), often known simply as Llorenç, is a Spanish former beach soccer player who played as a forward. He represented Spain at the FIFA Beach Soccer World Cup in 2013, 2015 and 2021. Llorenç was considered as one of the best players in the world during his career and one of the best Spanish players ever, having won the best player award at the 2018 Beach Soccer Stars awards ceremony.

He retired from the sport prematurely in September 2021, aged just 29, citing chronic injuries. He was close to 1000 career goals at the time of his retirement.

Career
Llorenç took up association football aged five and developed aspirations of becoming a professional player. At age 13, he joined the youth academy of Gimnàstic de Tarragona. Llorenç subsequently began suffering knee problems at the age of 16, ultimately resulting in a diagnosis of osteoarthritis and the need for multiple operations. He was advised to train on sand as part of his rehabilitation as the surface is low-impact on knees; this is where Llorenç first encountered beach soccer. He developed a liking for the derivative and took it up as a hobby. Aged 19, he was told to abandon his desire of becoming a footballer because of his medical condition.

Thus, Llorenç began to pursue beach soccer more seriously; he experienced a rapid rise through the ranks. After joining his local club in Torredembarra, he was soon selected for the Catalonian regional team. It was playing for the latter where Llorenç was spotted by coach Joaquín Alonso and called up to the Spanish national team. He debuted at the second stage of the 2011 Euro Beach Soccer League, and from there quickly established himself as part of the squad. In 2013, he took the number 10 shirt from the recently retired Amarelle and helped Spain to a runners-up finish at the 2013 FIFA Beach Soccer World Cup, scoring his country's only goal in the final. In 2014, he was nominated as one of the world's best three players of the year and was part of the team of the year at the Beach Soccer Stars awards ceremony; FIFA.com too called Llorenç a "emerging star" of the sport. He also won the award for best goal of the year.

As well as continuing to represent Spain, in order to make a full living from the sport, he has also played for numerous club sides in leagues around the world as a sought after player. Major clubs include Barcelona (Spain), Kristall (Russia), Lokomotiv Moscow (Russia), Flamengo (Brazil), KP Łódź (Poland), Falfala Kfar Qassem (Israel), Tokyo Verdy (Japan), Catania (Italy) and Artur Music (Ukraine). He has tasted international success in the 2015 Mundialito de Clubes, 2015 Euro Winners Cup, 2017 Mundialito de Clubes and 2019 World Winners Cup with each of the first four clubs respectively.

He regularly wins top scorer and best player awards at the events in which he plays; he has accumulated over 40 individual awards in his career.

In 2018, Llorenç was named as the best beach soccer player in the world at the Beach Soccer Stars awards, ahead of Brazilians, Bruno Xavier and Datiñha. The commendation was presented to him by his former teammate and idol, Amarelle. He collected the award on crutches, having fractured his metatarsal at the Intercontinental Cup.

Llorenç's third appearance at the World Cup, in 2021, was marred by injury and a red card in Spain's second match versus Tahiti. A month later, in a shock announcement on social media, he declared that he was retiring from beach soccer due to the "degenerative" nature of his injuries and the need to prioritise his quality of life. Within a fortnight, he was named as the new head coach of the Catalonia regional team.

Style of play
Llorenç is known for his finishing ability, technical skills and natural ability at bicycle kicks. He is a forward but is known to be versatile and so can play in any outfield position if required. Fellow Spanish teammate, Dona, says that Llorenç will shoot and score when least expected and will always perform when his team need him to the most. He claims to have "learnt everything" about beach soccer from Amarelle. He has also been compared to Ronaldinho. Llorenç is left-footed.

Personal life
Llorenç was born in Sant Cugat del Vallès but has lived in Torredembarra since he was seven years old. He has three sisters, and as of 2019, a total of seven nephews and nieces. Ronaldinho was his childhood idol. He can speak five languages and can play the guitar. He is well known for his exuberance and positive, philosophical outlook towards life.

He studied to be a "Senior Sports Physical Activities Technician" and holds a UEFA A Licence. In addition, Llorenç owns his own sports brand, "Enzo10", and is signed with adidas.

Llorenç supports RCD Espanyol and received a special reception from club in 2013 after Spain's second-place finish at the World Cup.

Statistics
Country

Club

Honours
The following is a selection, not an exhaustive list, of the major honours Llorenç has achieved:

Country
FIFA Beach Soccer World Cup
Runner-up (1): 2013
Euro Beach Soccer League
Runner-up (2): 2014, 2018
Third place (1): 2019
Intercontinental Cup
Runner-up (1): 2019
European Games:
Silver medal (1): 2019
Euro Beach Soccer Cup:
Winner (1): 2014
Mundialito:
Winner (1): 2013
Runner-up (1): 2018

Club

National
Leagues won
Liga Nacional (Spain): 2012
Superliga (Russia): 2015
Swiss League: 2017
Ekstraklasa (Poland): 2017
Campeonato Elite (Portugal): 2017
JFA League (Japan): 2018
Liga Carioca (Brazil): 2019

Cups won
Copa Italiana (Italy): 2012
Russian Cup: 2015
Polish Cup: 2018

International
Euro Winners Cup:
Winner (1): 2015
Mundialito de Clubes
Winner (2): 2015, 2017
World Winners Cup
Winner (1): 2019
Copa Libertadores
Runner-up (1): 2017

Individual

Beach Soccer Stars (5):
World's best player: 2018
World's top 3 best players: 2014
World dream team: 2014, 2018
Goal of the year: 2014
Euro Beach Soccer League (9):
Superfinal:
Best player: 2018
Top scorer: 2014
Regular season stages:
Best player: 2012(1), 2017(1)
Top scorer: 2012(1), 2013(1), 2014(1), 2017(1), 2018(1)
Mundialito (1):
Top scorer: 2013
World Beach Games qualification (1):
Best player: 2019

Euro Winners Cup (2):
Top scorer: 2018, 2020
Liga Nacional (Spain; 4):
Best player: 2012
Top scorer: 2012, 2013, 2017
Superliga (Russia; 3):
Best player: 2017 (stage 1), 2018
Top scorer: 2018
Ekstraklasa (Poland; 2):
Top scorer: 2018, 2020
JFA League (Japan; 1):
Top scorer: 2018
Liga Carioca (Brazil; 2):
Best player: 2019
Top scorer: 2019

References

External links
Official website
Llorenç Gomez, profile at Beach Soccer Worldwide
Llorenc Gomez, profile at Beach Soccer Russia (in Russian)

1991 births
Living people
Spanish footballers
Spanish beach soccer players
Association football forwards
European Games silver medalists for Spain
Beach soccer players at the 2015 European Games
European Games medalists in beach soccer
Beach soccer players at the 2019 European Games